Palacio de López (Spanish for Palace of the López) is a palace in Asunción, Paraguay, that serves as workplace for the President of Paraguay, and is also the seat of the government of Paraguay. 

Located in the center of Asunción, looking at the bay, this building was built by order of Carlos Antonio López, to serve as residence for his son, the General Francisco Solano López, there the fact that the building name is "Palacio de los López". His works began in 1857 under the direction of the English architect Alonso Taylor.

The materials for the construction of the palace came from several places inside the country, stones from the quarries of Emboscada and Altos, woods and odrajes of Ñeembucú and Yaguarón, bricks of Tacumbú, iron pieces molten in Ybycuí, etc.

Various European artists came to Paraguay to handle building decoration.
In 1867, during the War of the Triple Alliance, the palace was almost finished, although were missing finishing details for completion. The ornamentation was statuettes of bronze and furniture imported from Paris, and large and decorated mirrors for halls.

The building also has extravagant night lighting.

External links
 Presidency of the Republic of Paraguay
 Bienvenidos / Welcome / Bem-vindos / Bienvenus

Buildings and structures in Asunción
Government buildings in Paraguay
Government of Paraguay
Presidential residences
Neoclassical palaces